This is an incomplete list of newspapers published in Botswana.

Newspapers 
Azhizhi
The Botswana Gazette
 The Business Weekly and Review https://businessweekly.co.bw/
 Botswana Guardian
 Daily News Botswana
 Farmers Guide
 Mmegi
 The Monitor
 The Patriot on Sunday
 The Sunday Standard
 The Voice
 Botswana Youth Magazine
 The Midweek Sun
 Weekend Post
The Daily News

See also
 Media of Botswana
 List of radio stations in Africa
 Telecommunications in Botswana
 Internet in Botswana

References

External links
 
 

Newspapers published in Botswana
Botswana
newspapers